Trichocolea is a genus of liverworts belonging to the family Trichocoleaceae.

The species of this genus are found in Eurasia and Australia.

Species include:
 Trichocolea allionii Stephani 
 Trichocolea australis Steph. 
 Trichocolea mollissima Hatcher 
 Trichocolea tomentella (Ehrh.) Dumort.

References

Jungermanniales
Jungermanniales genera